Kana Nomura (born 23 March 1990) is a Japanese field hockey player for the Japanese national team.

She participated at the 2018 Women's Hockey World Cup.

References

External links
 

1990 births
Living people
Japanese female field hockey players
Female field hockey defenders
Field hockey players at the 2020 Summer Olympics
Olympic field hockey players of Japan